Lt.-Col. Ronald Townshend Fellowes, 2nd Baron Ailwyn  (7 December 1886 – 30 August 1936) was a British peer, the son of Ailwyn Edward Fellowes, 1st Baron Ailwyn. He succeeded to the Barony on 23 September 1924. He lived at Honingham Hall in Norfolk until he sold it in 1935.

He married Mildred King  on 21 August 1916.

He died, without issue, on 30 August 1936 at age 49, from wounds received in the First World War.

References

1886 births
1936 deaths
2
Recipients of the Military Cross
Companions of the Distinguished Service Order
British Army personnel of World War I
Rifle Brigade officers